Thomas Worthington (born 1866; date of death unknown), commonly known as Tom Worthington, was a Welsh footballer who played as a midfielder and made one appearance for the Wales national team.

Career
Worthington made his first and only international appearance for Wales on 24 March 1894 in the 1893–94 British Home Championship against Scotland. The away match, which took place in Kilmarnock, finished as a 2–5 loss for Wales.

Career statistics

International

References

External links
 
 

1866 births
Date of birth missing
Year of death missing
Welsh footballers
Wales international footballers
Association football midfielders
Newtown A.F.C. players